Lorenzo Balducci (born 4 September 1982) is an Italian actor. He appeared in more than thirty films since 2001.

Life and career
Balducci was born in Rome, Italy. He began taking acting classes when he was 14  and in November 2001 he made his stage debut as Romeo in a modern revival of William Shakespeare's Romeo and Juliet, also starring Italian actress Myriam Catania.  He is openly gay.

After roles in a few TV commercials, he got a small part in Pupi Avati's The Knights of the Quest, that marked his film debut. Bigger roles quickly followed in films and television projects such as The Good Pope: Pope John XXIII, the acclaimed Incantato and the Italian box office hit Three Steps Over Heaven. His first lead role was in Luciano Melchionna's Gas, an indie drama that was selected at the inaugural Rome Film Festival and for which he won the Best Actor Award at the Chieti Film Festival.

He has appeared in more than thirty European films and television series since then, including Le héros de la famille, The Stone Council (both opposite Catherine Deneuve), André Téchiné's The Witnesses, Krzysztof Zanussi's Black Sun, Carlos Saura's I, Don Giovanni and the highly acclaimed Italian TV series Le cose che restano. In 2009 he received the Susan Batson Award for his performance in Due vite per caso at the San Francisco's NICE Film Festival.

Internationally, he starred in the Mexican romantic comedy 31 Días (opposite Karla Souza), the controversial Spanish film Estrella fugaz, the American TV movie Barabbas (starring Billy Zane) and the Italian TV series Mai per amore. He also appeared in the American independent comedy In search of Fellini (opposite Maria Bello), the acclaimed short film Snowflake (as Tracy Middendorf's love interest and for which he also served as an executive producer) and guest starred in the TV drama Medici: Masters of Florence.

In 2015 he was a member of the jury at the 30th Torino Gay & Lesbian Film Festival.

On stage, Balducci has starred in several productions of Dignità Autonome di Prostituzione in both Italy and Spain and, in 2017, he was part of the ensemble cast of Luciano Melchionna's Spoglia-Toy.

In 2018 he starred as John in 7 Miracles, one of the first feature-length cinematic VR experiences which premiered at the 26th Raindance Film Festival, winning the “VR Film of the Festival” grand jury award.

In 2019 he reprised his role in Luciano Melchionna's acclaimed play Spoglia-Toy and played Giulio Mieli in Gli anni amari, a biopic based on the life of Mario Mieli, a leading figure in the Italian gay movement of the 1970s.

In 2021 he starred in the stand-up comedy show Allegro, Non Troppo, originally produced to debut in 2020 but post-poned due to the COVID-19 pandemic. After the debut at Teatro dei Filodrammatici in Milan, the show run successfully at the Off-Off Theatre in Rome and then continued to tour around Italy.

In 2022 he directed his first music video, Per Dirsi Mai by Italian electro-pop violinist and singer H.E.R.

Filmography

Film

Television

Music Videos

Theatre

References

External links 
 

1982 births
Living people
Italian male film actors
Italian male television actors
Italian male stage actors
Male actors from Rome
Italian gay actors
21st-century Italian male actors
20th-century Italian LGBT people
21st-century Italian LGBT people